Mountview is an unincorporated community in Raleigh and Summers counties, West Virginia, United States. Mountview is west of Hinton and southeast of Beckley. County Routes 3/1, 3/12, and 19/22 are in Mountview. There are two ponds: one near Mt. View Road and another near Country Route 3/12. Spicelick Creek, Glade Creek, and Farley Creek run through the town. Features close to Mountview are Lake View Golf Course and the artificial Flat Top Lake.

References

Unincorporated communities in Raleigh County, West Virginia
Unincorporated communities in Summers County, West Virginia
Unincorporated communities in West Virginia